Amanita virosiformis, commonly known as the narrow-spored destroying angel, is a poisonous basidiomycete fungus, one of many in the genus Amanita. Originally described from Florida, it is found from coastal North Carolina through to eastern Texas in the southeastern United States.

See also

List of Amanita species
List of deadly fungi

References

virosiformis
Deadly fungi
Poisonous fungi
Fungi of the United States
Fungi described in 1941
Fungi without expected TNC conservation status